Jasbir Singh Sandhu is an Indian politician and the Member of the Legislative Assembly (MLA) from Amritsar West Assembly constituency. He is a member of the Aam Aadmi Party.

Member of Legislative Assembly
He represents the Amritsar West Assembly constituency as MLA in Punjab Assembly. The Aam Aadmi Party gained a strong 79% majority in the sixteenth Punjab Legislative Assembly by winning 92 out of 117 seats in the 2022 Punjab Legislative Assembly election. MP Bhagwant Mann was sworn in as Chief Minister on 16 March 2022.

Committee assignments of Punjab Legislative Assembly  
Member (2022–23) Committee on Public Undertakings 
Member (2022–23) Committee on Subordinate Legislation

Electoral performance

References

Living people
Punjab, India MLAs 2022–2027
Aam Aadmi Party politicians from Punjab, India
Year of birth missing (living people)